Naughty Baby is a live album by Maureen McGovern. It was recorded at Studio A at Clinton Recording Studios in New York City. The studio was converted into an intimate concert setting and invitations were sent to 150 guest.

The album consists of 24 songs that were all co-written by George Gershwin (Gershwin's brother Ira co-wrote the majority of the songs), one of them was a lost song entitled "A Corner of Heaven With You" (written c. 1918 with lyrics by Lou Paley). In the selection of "My Man's Gone Now," McGovern vocalizes and never sings. Between the songs "The Man I Love" and "Summertime," there is a piano solo that is provided by Jeff Harris. The last selection is a medley of two songs: "Love Is Here to Stay" and "Of Thee I Sing."

The last three pages inside the album cover contain liner notes from Michael Tilson Thomas, Roger Kellaway, Frances "Frankie" Gershwin Godowsky (sister of George and Ira Gershwin), Tommy Krasker, and Ron Barron respectively.

Track listing

Personnel
Musicians
Jeff Harris – piano, conductor
Jay Leonhart – double bass
Grady Tate – drums
Lou Marini – reeds
Mark Sherman – percussion and vibes

Arrangements
"Stiff Upper Lip," "Things Are Looking Up," "(I've Got) Beginner's Luck," "A Corner of Heaven With You," "Somebody Loves Me," "Little Jazz Bird," "The Man I Love," "Piano Prelude II," "Summertime," "Gershwin Tribute," and "Love Is Here to Stay/Of Thee I Sing" arranged by Mike Renzi
"By Strauss," "My Man's Gone Now," and "Porgy, I's Yo' Woman Now" arranged by Jeff Harris
"How Long Has This Been Going On?" and "Embraceable You" arranged by Mike Renzi and Jeff Harris
"Love Walked In": body of melody arranged by Mike Renzi; introduction and ending arranged by Jeff Harris

Additional personnel
Cover design: Allen Weinberg
Cover photo: Joyce Tenneson
Hair design: Maggie Allen
Dress courtesy of Giorgio di Sant'Angelo; earrings by Ted Muehling
Live Gershwin concert written by Judy Barron, produced by Ron Barron, and directed by Susan H. Schulman

External links
Maureen McGovern – Naughty Baby

Maureen McGovern albums
Covers albums
1989 live albums
Columbia Records live albums